Boat Owners Association of The United States, better known as BoatUS, is an American association of boat owners with more than 800,000 dues-paying members offering various services supporting TowBoatUS on water recreational boat towing as well as roadside boat trailer towingactivities. Additional services are boat insuranceBoatUS Magazine subscription, discounts on boating-related products and services, and lobbying organization on behalf of boat owners. The organization is based in Springfield, Virginia, and promotes itself as “The Nation’s Largest Advocacy, Services and Safety Group for recreational boat owners” and "The Boat Owners Auto Club" for its similarities to AAA.

BoatUS also gave rise to the organization that would be eventually called the BoatUS Foundation for Boating Safety and Clean Water, a 501(c)(3) charitable organization that promotes safe boating including a state-level boating safety course and environmentally responsible boating practices.

See also 
West Marine
AAA

External links 
BoatUS official web site
BoatUS Foundation

References 

Financial services companies established in 1966
Boating associations
1966 establishments in the United States